Streptomyces montanus is a bacterium species from the genus of Streptomyces which has been isolated from soil from the Mount Song.

See also 
 List of Streptomyces species

References 

montanus
Bacteria described in 2020